π Persei, Latinized as Pi Persei, is a single star in the northern constellation of Perseus. It has the traditional name Gorgonea Secunda  , the second of three Gorgons in the mythology of the hero Perseus. This star has a white hue and is faintly visible to the naked eye with an apparent visual magnitude of +4.7. It is located at a distance of approximately 303 light years from the Sun based on parallax, and is moving further away with a radial velocity of +14 km/s.

This object is an A-type main-sequence star with a stellar classification of A2Vn, where the 'n' suffix indicates broad (nebulous) lines due to rapid rotation. It is spinning with a projected rotational velocity of 186 km/s, which is creating an equatorial bulge that is 6% wider than the polar radius. The star is 272 million years old with double the mass of the Sun. It has 4.8 times the Sun's radius and is radiating 170 times the luminosity of the Sun from its photosphere at an effective temperature of 9,290 K.

References

A-type main-sequence stars
Perseus (constellation)
Persei, Pi
BD+39 681
Persei, 22
018411
013879
0879
Gorgonea Secunda